Novomichurinsk is a town in Pronsky District of Ryazan Oblast, Russia, located on the Pronya River  south of Ryazan, the administrative center of the oblast. Population:

History
It was founded in 1968 and granted town status in 1981. It is named after Ivan Vladimirovich Michurin, who was born not far from this town.

Administrative and municipal status
Within the framework of administrative divisions, it is incorporated within Pronsky District as the town of district significance of Novomichurinsk. As a municipal division, the town of district significance of Novomichurinsk is incorporated within Pronsky Municipal District as Novomichurinskoye Urban Settlement.

Economy
Novomichurinsk is a company town of the Ryazan Power Station.

Notable residents 

Yuri Bykov (born 1981), filmmaker, screenwriter and actor

References

Notes

Sources

Cities and towns in Ryazan Oblast
Cities and towns built in the Soviet Union
Populated places established in 1968